Don Kerrigan (1941–1990) was a Scottish professional footballer, who played for St Mirren, Aberdeen, Heart of Midlothian, Dunfermline Athletic, Fulham,  Lincoln City and Portadown.

References

1941 births
1990 deaths
Date of death missing
Place of death missing
Association football wingers
Scottish footballers
Drumchapel Amateur F.C. players
St Mirren F.C. players
Aberdeen F.C. players
Heart of Midlothian F.C. players
Dunfermline Athletic F.C. players
Fulham F.C. players
Lincoln City F.C. players
Portadown F.C. players
Scottish Football League players
English Football League players
Footballers from North Ayrshire